Donald Crawford KC FRSE (5 May 1837–1 January 1919) was a Scottish advocate who became a United Kingdom Liberal MP. He sat for the constituency of Lanarkshire North-East from 1885 to 1895.

Life

He was born on 3 May 1837, the son of Alexander Crawford of Edinburgh and his wife, Sibella Maclean. He was educated at Edinburgh Academy from 1847 to 1854. He attended Glasgow, Oxford and Heidelberg Universities. At Oxford he studied at Balliol College from 1856 and was awarded a B.A. in 1860; his M.A. was granted in 1864. He became a Fellow of Lincoln College in 1861, retaining his Fellowship until 1882.

He was made an advocate in 1862 and from 1880 to 1885 served as Secretary to the Lord Advocate of Scotland.

In 1873 he was elected a Fellow of the Royal Society of Edinburgh. His proposers were Robert William Thomson, Thomas Croxen Archer, Francis Deas and John Hutton Balfour.

In 1884 the Liberal President of the Local Government Board, Sir Charles Dilke, appointed Crawford to the Boundary Commission for Scotland, which was responsible for the redrafting of constituency boundaries in the wake of the Third Reform Act. Crawford, at the time, was the political secretary to Sir John Balfour, then the Lord Advocate. Crawford, in addition, was the distant relative of Dilke's. The Conservative Leader in the House of Commons, Sir Stafford Northcote, objected to Crawford's appointment on these grounds, noting that Crawford was "a keen Liberal with a thorough knowledge of Scotland."

Crawford entered parliament the next year as a member for Lanarkshire North-East. This was a new constituency, created by the Boundary Commission's division of Lanarkshire North into two new constituencies (the other being Lanarkshire North-West).

He served as Sheriff of Aberdeen from 1895 to 1911. In 1903 he was made a King's Counsel (KC). In 1909 Aberdeen University awarded him an honorary doctorate (LLD).

Crawford is buried beneath a large flat stone in the central section of St Cuthbert's churchyard in Edinburgh.

Family

Crawford was firstly married to Virginia Mary Smith (1862–1948), although the marriage was brief and unhappy. In 1886 Crawford achieved much social and public notoriety when he sued her for divorce, and named Dilke as the co-respondent. After a much publicized trial Crawford obtained a decree nisi and the marriage was dissolved in 1886. As for Dilke, the scandal wrecked a promising political career. Virginia Crawford later converted to Roman Catholicism and join the Catholic Women's League.

In old age (1914) he married the Hon Lilian Mary Susan Moncrieff.

Notes

External links 
 

1837 births
1919 deaths
People educated at Edinburgh Academy
Members of the Parliament of the United Kingdom for Scottish constituencies
Scottish Liberal Party MPs
UK MPs 1885–1886
UK MPs 1886–1892
UK MPs 1892–1895
Scottish sheriffs
Alumni of Balliol College, Oxford
Fellows of Lincoln College, Oxford